David Studdard (born November 22, 1955) is a former offensive tackle in the National Football League (NFL) for the Denver Broncos. He played college football at the University of Texas.

Studdard's son Kasey followed his father's footsteps to play football at Texas and went on to play in the NFL for the Houston Texans.

References

1955 births
Living people
American football offensive tackles
Denver Broncos players
Texas Longhorns football players